Nakao (written: 中尾) is a Japanese surname. Notable people with the surname include:

Akira Nakao (born 1942), Japanese actor, TV personality and artist from Kisarazu, Chiba
Akira Nakao (boxer) (born 1909), Japanese boxer who competed in the 1932 Summer Olympics
, Japanese actor
Eiichi Nakao (born 1930), Japanese politician
Eri Nakao, Japanese voice actress
Janine Nakao (born 1987), judoka from USA
Jutaro Nakao (born 1970), Japanese mixed martial artist
Koji Nakao (born 1981), former Japanese football player
Kotaro Nakao (born 1969), former Japanese football player
Mana Nakao (born 1986), Japanese football player
Mie Nakao (born 1946), Japanese actress and singer
Miki Nakao (born 1978), former backstroke swimmer from Japan and Olympic medallist
Ryūsei Nakao (born 1951), Japanese actor, voice actor and singer
Seigo Nakao, head of Japanese Studies at Oakland University, Rochester, Michigan, United States
Takayoshi Nakao (born 1956), former Japanese professional baseball player
Takehiko Nakao (born 1956), Japanese civil servant, elected ninth president of the Asian Development Bank in 2013
Tomomi Nakao (born 1981), former Japanese volleyball player who played for Ageo Medics
 Toshiyuki Nakao, professional shogi player
Tsuyoshi Nakao (born 1983), former Japanese football player
Wendy Egyoku Nakao, the abbott of the Zen Center of Los Angeles
Yoshihiro Nakao, Japanese semi-retired professional mixed martial artist
Masaki Nakao, (born 1996), Japanese actor and entertainer

See also
Na Kaeo
Naka (disambiguation)
Nako (disambiguation)
Nam khao

 Japanese-language surnames